Yusef Lateef's Detroit (subtitled Latitude 42° 30′ Longitude 83°) is an album by multi-instrumentalist Yusef Lateef recorded in 1969 (with one track from The Complete Yusef Lateef recording sessions in 1967) and released on the Atlantic label.

Reception

Allmusic reviewer Thom Jurek described it as "one of Lateef's most misunderstood recordings".

Track listing 
All compositions by Yusef Lateef except as indicated
 "Bishop School" - 3:00
 "Livingston Playground" - 3:37
 "Eastern Market" - 4:15
 "Belle Isle" - 3:12
 "Russell and Elliot" - 4:47
 "Raymond Winchester" - 2:35
 "Woodward Avenue"- 2:11
 "That Lucky Old Sun" (Haven Gillespie, Beasley Smith) - 7:25
Recorded at Century Sound Studios in New York City on February 4, 1969 (tracks 1, 4, 5 & 7) and February 5, 1969 (tracks 2, 3, & 6) and on June 1, 1967 in New York City (track 8)

Personnel 
Yusef Lateef - alto saxophone, tenor saxophone, flute, oboe, vocals
Thad Jones (tracks 1, 4, 5 & 7), Danny Moore (tracks 2, 3, & 6), Jimmy Owens (tracks 1-7), Snooky Young (tracks 1-7) - trumpet
Eric Gale - guitar (tracks 1-7)
Hugh Lawson - piano
Cecil McBee - bass
Chuck Rainey - electric bass (tracks 1-7)
Bernard Purdie (tracks 1-7) - drums, Roy Brooks (track 8), 
Ray Barretto (tracks 1, 4, 5 & 7), Norman Pride (tracks 2, 3, & 6) - congas
Albert Heath - percussion (tracks 1-7)
Selwart Clarke, James Tryon - violin (tracks 1, 3, 4 & 6)
Alfred Brown - viola (tracks 1, 3, 4 & 6)
Kermit Moore - cello (tracks 1, 3, 4 & 6)

References 

Yusef Lateef albums
1969 albums
Albums produced by Joel Dorn
Atlantic Records albums